Conrad Pope is an American composer and orchestrator. He has worked on numerous films and has collaborated with composers such as John Williams, James Newton Howard, Alan Silvestri, Danny Elfman, Mark Isham, James Horner, John Powell, Alexandre Desplat, and Howard Shore.

Filmography
 "Tim's Vermeer" (2013)
Orchestrator and Conductor
 The Hobbit: The Desolation of Smaug (2013)
Orchestrator and Conductor
 My Week with Marilyn (2011)
Composer (With Alexandre Desplat)
 Harry Potter and the Deathly Hallows – Part 2 (2011)
Supervising Orchestrator
 Harry Potter and the Deathly Hallows – Part 1 (2010)
Supervising Orchestrator
 In My Sleep (2010)
Original Music
 Salt (2010)
Orchestrator
 The Wolfman (2010)
Additional Music
 Bad Lieutenant: Port of Call New Orleans (2009)
Supervising Orchestrator
 Crossing Over (2009)
Supervising Orchestrator
 A Christmas Carol (2009)
Orchestrator
 Ice Age: Dawn of the Dinosaurs (2009)
Orchestrator
 Julie and Julia (2009)
Orchestrator
 Horton Hears a Who (2008)
Orchestrations
 Indiana Jones and the Kingdom of the Crystal Skull (2008)
Orchestrations
 Pride and Glory (2008)
Orchestrations
 The Curious Case of Benjamin Button (2008)
Orchestrations
 The Express: The Ernie Davis Story (2008)
Orchestrations
 The Secret Life of Bees (2008)
Supervising Orchestrations
 The Tale of Despereaux (2008)
Orchestrations
 Freedom Writers (2007)
Orchestrations
 Gracie (2007)
Supervising Orchestrator
 In the Valley of Elah (2007)
Orchestrator
 Lions for Lambs (2007)
Orchestrations
 Next (2007)
Orchestrations
 No Reservations (2007)
Music Conductor (Truffles and Quail), Music Producer (Truffles and Quail)
 The Golden Compass (2007) Supervising Orchestrator, Orchestrations
 Bobby (2006)
Orchestrations
 Firewall (2006)
Orchestrations
 Invincible (2006)
Orchestrations
 Night at the Museum (2006)
Score Orchestrator
 X-Men: The Last Stand (2006)
Orchestrations
 Flightplan (2005)
Orchestrations
 King Kong (2005)
Orchestrations
 Memoirs of a Geisha (2005)
Orchestrations
 Munich (2005)
Orchestrations
 Star Wars: Episode III – Revenge of the Sith (2005)
Orchestrations
 War of the Worlds (2005)
Orchestrations
 The Legend of Zorro (2005)
Orchestrations
 Harry Potter and the Prisoner of Azkaban (2004)
Orchestration
 Troy (film) (2004)
Orchestrations and Additional Music
 The Polar Express (2004)
Orchestrations
 Hollywood Homicide (2003)
Orchestrations
 Peter Pan (2003)
Orchestrations
 The Matrix Revolutions (2003)
Orchestrations
 The Matrix Reloaded (2003)
Original Music
 Harry Potter and the Chamber of Secrets (2002)
Original Music
 Star Trek: Nemesis (2002)
Orchestration
 Star Wars: Episode II - Attack of the Clones (2002)
Orchestration
 The Rising Place (2002)
Composer
 Harry Potter and the Sorcerer's Stone (2001)
Orchestrations
 Pavilion of Women (2001)
Music, Orchestration
 The Amati Girls (2001)
Music
 The Mexican (2001)
Original Music
 Battlefield Earth (2000)
Orchestra conductor
 Lloyd (2000)
Music
 What Women Want (2000)
Music orchestrator
 Sleepy Hollow (1999)
Orchestration
 Star Wars: Episode I - The Phantom Menace (1999)
Orchestration
 Stuart Little (1999)
Original music
 The Matrix (1999)
Original Music
 Amistad (1997)
Orchestration
 Butch Camp (1997)
Music
 Home Alone 3 (1997)
Original Music
 Jungle2jungle (1997)
Original Music
 Mouse Hunt (1997)
Original Music
 Volcano (1997)
Original Music
 A Smile Like Yours (1997)
Original Music
 The Lost World: Jurassic Park (1997)
Orchestration
 Eraser (1996)
Original Music
 My Fellow Americans (1996)
Original Music
 The Long Kiss Goodnight (1996)
Original Music
 Metalbeast (1995)
Composer
 The Set Up (1995)
Composer
 The Santa Clause (1994)
Song Arrangement ( The Bells of Christmas )
 The Santa Clause (1994)
Orchestration
 Once Upon a Forest (1993)
Orchestration
 Jurassic Park (1993)
Orchestration
 Temptation (1993)
Music
 Patriot Games (1992)
Original Music

References

External links 
 
 

American film score composers
Living people
Year of birth missing (living people)